was a town located in Kitaakita District, Akita Prefecture, Japan.

In 2003, the town had an estimated population of 20,962 and a density of 64.31 persons per km². The total area was 325.97 km².

On March 22, 2005, Takanosu, along with the towns of Aikawa, Ani and Moriyoshi (all from Kitaakita District) merged to create the city of Kitaakita.

Climate

References

External links
 Kitaakita official website 

Dissolved municipalities of Akita Prefecture
Kitaakita